Smita Patil (17 October 1955 – 13 December 1986) was an Indian actress of film, television and theatre. Regarded among the finest stage and film actresses of her times and one of the greatest film actresses of all time, Smita Patil appeared in over 80 Hindi, Bengali, Marathi, Gujarati, Malayalam and Kannada films in a career that spanned just over a decade. During her career, she received two National Film Awards and a Filmfare Award. She was the recipient of the Padma Shri, India's fourth-highest civilian honour in 1985.
She made her film debut with Shyam Benegal's Charandas Chor (1975). She became one of the leading actresses of parallel cinema, a New Wave movement in India cinema, though she also appeared in several mainstream movies throughout her career. Her performances were often acclaimed, and her most notable roles include Manthan (1977), Bhumika (1977), Jait Re Jait (1978),Gaman (1978),Aakrosh (1980), Chakra (1981), Namak Halaal (1982), Bazaar (1982), Umbartha (1982), Shakti (1982), Arth (1982), Ardh Satya (1983), Mandi (1983), Aaj Ki Awaaz (1984), Chidambaram (1985), Mirch Masala (1985), Amrit (1986) and Waaris (1988).

Apart from acting, Patil was an active feminist and a member of the Women's Centre in Mumbai. She was deeply committed to the advancement of women's issues and gave her endorsement to films which sought to explore the role of women in traditional Indian society, their sexuality, and the changes facing the middle-class woman in an urban milieu.

Patil was married to actor Raj Babbar. She died on 13 December 1986 at the age of 31 due to childbirth complications. Over ten of her films were released after her death. Her son Prateik Babbar is a film actor who made his debut in 2008.

The following list shows the filmography in which Patil starred.

Filmography

Posthumous releases

References 

Actress filmographies
Indian filmographies